Events in the year 1988 in Switzerland.

Incumbents
Federal Council:
Otto Stich (President)
Jean-Pascal Delamuraz
Elisabeth Kopp 
Arnold Koller 
Flavio Cotti
René Felber 
Adolf Ogi

Births

 8 February - Christian Schneuwly.
 30 November - Benjamin Lüthi.
 18 February - Michael Siegfried.
 1 September - Simona de Silvestro

Deaths

 28 February - Hermann Burger.
 9 May - Karl Brunner.
 29 July - Georges Vuilleumier.
Date unknown
 August - Albert Büchi.
 Benjamin Romieux.

References

 
Years of the 20th century in Switzerland
1980s in Switzerland